Pedro Jorge Ramos Moreira (born 16 January 1983 in Lisbon) is a Cape Verdean former professional footballer who played as a forward.

References

External links

Football-Lineups profile

1983 births
Living people
Portuguese people of Cape Verdean descent
Citizens of Cape Verde through descent
Footballers from Lisbon
Portuguese footballers
Cape Verdean footballers
Association football forwards
Liga Portugal 2 players
Segunda Divisão players
F.C. Barreirense players
U.D. Leiria players
Louletano D.C. players
C.D. Fátima players
G.D. Estoril Praia players
Associação Naval 1º de Maio players
Atlético Clube de Portugal players
U.D. Oliveirense players
Liga I players
FC Gloria Buzău players
Cypriot First Division players
Nea Salamis Famagusta FC players
Cape Verde international footballers
Cape Verdean expatriate footballers
Expatriate footballers in Romania
Expatriate footballers in Cyprus
Cape Verdean expatriate sportspeople in Romania
Cape Verdean expatriate sportspeople in Cyprus